Nijdam is a Dutch surname. Notable people with the surname include:

Henk Nijdam (1935–2009), Dutch cyclist
Jelle Nijdam (born 1963), Dutch cyclist, son of Henk

Dutch-language surnames